Zanzibar national under-20 football team are an international association football team representing the island nation of Zanzibar at under 20 level. In some competitions such as the ELF Cup, the team have represented the full Zanzibar national football team. The team achieved fourth place at the 2006 ELF Cup in Northern Cyprus.

Honours
CECAFA U-20 Championship:
Winners (1): 2003

References 

Zanzibari football clubs
U